George James Rankin,  (1 May 1887 – 28 December 1957) was an Australian soldier and politician. He served in both the House of Representatives and the Senate, representing the Country Party of Australia.

Early life
Rankin was born at Bamawm, Victoria, the tenth child of Irish farmer James Rankin and Sarah, née Gallagher. He attended the local state school and became a farmer. In 1907, he joined the Militia, and was commissioned in the 9th Light Horse Regiment in 1909. He married Annie Isabella Oliver at Rochester, Victoria on 7 July 1912. In 1914, he was appointed a lieutenant of the Australian Imperial Force and posted to the 4th Light Horse Regiment.

Military service
Rankin served in the 4th Light Horse Regiment and reached Gallipoli in May 1915, was wounded in July, became a captain in December, and a major in March 1916. He also served in the Sinai, and was second in command of his unit from August 1917. Rankin was present at the famous charge at Beersheba on 31 October, and in 1918 was awarded the Distinguished Service Order (DSO) for his gallantry. His leadership subsequently earned him a Bar to his DSO.

After the conclusion of the war, Rankin was sent to Egypt to suppress a rebellion, after which he returned to Australia. He returned to the Militia, becoming a brigadier in 1936 and a major general in 1937. During this time, he developed an interest in politics, in particular the Country Party.

Federal politics
Rankin was elected chief president of the Victorian United Country Party (VUCP) in 1937, but resigned later that year in order to contest the seat of Bendigo in the Australian House of Representatives. He was elected, and became part of the faction of the Country Party that advocated coalition with the United Australia Party. However, he was forced to back down on this by the State council of the VUCP.

Rankin became well known as an advocate of returned servicemen and wheat-farmers. He was a voracious critic of the Labor governments of John Curtin and Ben Chifley. When in 1949, an electoral redistribution substantially changed Rankin's seat, he contested the Senate instead and won. He was returned in 1951, but his parliamentary activity steadily decreased. He remained an active and vigorous anti-communist until his retirement, due to ill health, in 1955.

Rankin died of cerebrovascular disease on 28 December 1957 at Rochester, where he was buried, and was survived by his wife.

In Popular Culture
He was played by Serge Lazareff in the film The Lighthorsemen (1987).

References

1887 births
1957 deaths
Australian military personnel of World War I
Military personnel from Victoria (Australia)
Australian generals
Members of the Australian House of Representatives
Members of the Australian House of Representatives for Bendigo
Members of the Australian Senate for Victoria
National Party of Australia members of the Parliament of Australia
Companions of the Distinguished Service Order
20th-century Australian politicians
Australian people of Irish descent